Jacob Thomas may refer to:

 Jacob Thomas (VC) (1833–1911), British Victoria Cross recipient
 Jacob Thomas (police officer) (born 1960), Indian Police Service
 Jacob Thomas (soccer) (born 1977), American soccer player

See also